Sir Edward Denny, 4th Baronet  (2 October 1796 – 13 June 1889) was an Anglo-Irish baronet and composer of hymns.

Life
He was the eldest son of Sir Edward Denny, 3rd Baronet and Elizabeth Day, daughter of the Hon. Robert Day, judge of the Court of King's Bench (Ireland) and his first wife Mary (Polly) Potts. In 1827, Denny became High Sheriff of Kerry. In 1831, he succeeded his father as baronet and inherited a substantial portion of Tralee. Denny remained unmarried throughout his life. His family motto was "Act Mea Messis Erit" — "in age my harvest shall be".

The following obituary appeared in the 19 June 1889 Leeds Mercury edited by Thomas Blackburn Baines:

Denny lived in later years at Bolton Gardens, Kensington and at another time at Islington, being then connected with the Brethren's Priory Meeting Room. He was associated with numerous principal men of the Plymouth Brethren movement including William Kelly, J.G. Bellett, John Nelson Darby, George Wigram. He also participated in the conferences held at Powerscourt House. Denny studied the subject of biblical prophecy and assisted by John Jewell Penstone (1817–1902) prepared valuable charts to illustrate dispensational teaching. The best-known publication was "A Prophetical Stream of Time".

Hymn writer
Denny published his own hymns, in 1839 "A Selection of Hymns" and in 1848, "Hymns and Poems", with new editions in 1870 and 1889. Some of his hymns appeared in "Hymns for the Poor of the Flock" (1840) hymn book. He did not like other editors amending his compositions to suit their tastes or doctrinal foibles. In the preface to "Hymns and Poems" Sir Edward Denny wrote, "I have been much grieved, I confess, to observe how the practice of needlessly altering some even of our well-known favourite hymns has lately prevailed ... should any of these poems or hymns be deemed worthy of a place in any further collections, may they be left as they are without alteration or abridgement".

Death
Denny died aged 93. He was buried at the Paddington Cemetery by the side of George Wigram who had died ten years before. His sister Dianna Denny survived her brother by six months, attaining the age of 85, and was buried with him. On their headstone was engraved the following inscription, "In joyful assurance of rising to an endless day". Today a modern replacement headstone does not have this inscription.

The title passed to Edward's nephew Robert, son of the Reverend Robert Denny.

References
 Chief Men among the Brethren, Hy Pickering.
 Chapter Two Archive, London

External links 
 

1796 births
1889 deaths
Baronets in the Baronetage of Ireland
Christian hymnwriters
Members of the Parliament of the United Kingdom for County Kerry constituencies (1801–1922)
People from County Kerry
British Plymouth Brethren
UK MPs 1818–1820
High Sheriffs of Kerry
Irish Plymouth Brethren
19th-century Anglo-Irish people